The Shire of Livingstone is a local government area located in the Capricornia region of Central Queensland, Queensland, Australia, to the immediate north and east of the regional city of Rockhampton. The Shire was re-established on 1 January 2014 following a successful de-amalgamation referendum in 2013.

Industry within the shire is diverse. Timber is harvested from extensive pine plantations near Byfield in the north. Significant pineapple production takes place within the shire, as well as other agricultural crops. Tourism is increasingly becoming a mainstay of the area, with Keppel Bay and the nearby islands a major drawcard, and more than half of the Shire's population lives in the coastal area centred on Yeppoon and Emu Park. The coastal strip within the shire is known as the Capricorn Coast. The Shoalwater Bay Military Training Area is also located within the shire.

History

On 11 November 1879, the Gogango Division was established as one of 74 divisions around Queensland under the Divisional Boards Act 1879 with a population of 5023. It covered an area of  surrounding but not including the town of Rockhampton—an area significantly greater than the modern Rockhampton Regional Council covers. Its administrative centre was in North Rockhampton.

A bridge was built spanning the Fitzroy River in 1882, and a year later in September 1883, the Borough of North Rockhampton was proclaimed.

On 3 March 1892, part of subdivision 2 of the Broadsound Division was transferred to subdivision 3 of the Gogango Division, while another part of subdivision 2 of the Broadsound Division was transferred to the Duaringa Division.

On 6 April 1899, the part of the Gogango Division south of the Fitzroy River split away to form the Fitzroy Division.

With the passage of the Local Authorities Act 1902, Gogango Division became the Shire of Gogango on 31 March 1903, and on 8 August 1903 it was renamed Shire of Livingstone.

On 1 July 1984, the neighbouring City of Rockhampton grew to include some of its outer suburbs which had previously been within the Shire of Livingstone.

On 15 March 2008, under the Local Government (Reform Implementation) Act 2007 passed by the Parliament of Queensland on 10 August 2007, the Shire of Livingstone merged with the City of Rockhampton and the Shires of Mount Morgan and Fitzroy to form the Rockhampton Region.

In 2012, a proposal was made to de-amalgamate the Shire of Livingstone from the Rockhampton Region. On 9 March 2013, the citizens of the former Livingstone shire voted in a referendum to de-amalgamate. The Shire of Livingstone was re-established on 1 January 2014.

Towns and localities
The Shire of Livingstone includes the following settlements:

Rockhampton area:
 Glendale
 Glenlee
 Ironpot
 Lakes Creek1
 Mount Chalmers
 Nankin
 Nerimbera
 Rockyview

Yeppoon-Keppel area:
 Adelaide Park
 Bangalee2
 Barlows Hill
 Barmaryee
 Causeway Lake
 Cooee Bay
 Coral Sea
 Emu Park
 Farnborough
 Hidden Valley
 Inverness
 Joskeleigh
 Keppel Sands
 Kinka Beach
 Lammermoor
 Meikleville Hill
 Mulambin
 Pacific Heights
 Rosslyn
 Taranganba
 Taroomball
 Yeppoon
 Zilzie

Other areas:
 Barmoya
 Bondoola
 Bungundarra
 Byfield
 Byfield NP
 Canal Creek
 Canoona
 Cawarral
 Cobraball
 Coorooman
 Coowonga
 Etna Creek
 Great Keppel Island
 Greenlake
 Jardine
 Kunwarara
 Lake Mary
 Marlborough

 Maryvale3
 Milman
 Mount Gardiner
 Mulara
 Ogmore
 Princhester
 Rossmoya
 Sandringham
 Shoalwater
 Shoalwater Bay
 Stanage
 Stockyard
 Tanby
 The Caves
 The Keppels
 Thompson Point
 Tungamull
 Wattlebank
 Weerriba
 Woodbury
 Yaamba

1 - shared with Rockhampton Region2 - not to be confused with Bangalee in the Gladstone Region3 - not to be confused with Maryvale in the Southern Downs Region

Climate 
The city has a tropical savanna climate (Köppen: Aw), marking the southern boundary of this climatic zone, more precisely in the Byfield National Park.

Libraries 
The Livingstone Shire Council operates public libraries in Byfield, Marlborough, Emu Park, and Yeppoon. It also supports volunteer-operated libraries in Mount Chalmers and Stanage Bay.

Population

Chairmen and mayors
The following were the chairmen and mayors of the Shire of Livingstone in its first incarnation:
 1927: W. Beak
 1933–1936 Owen Daniel
 John Murray
 1983: Lindsay Hartwig served for one year
 The following were the mayors of Shire of Livingstone in its second incarnation:
 2014–2020 : Bill Ludwig
2020–present: Andrew Darryl Ireland

References

 
1879 establishments in Australia
Local government areas of Queensland
2008 disestablishments in Australia
Populated places disestablished in 2008
2014 establishments in Australia
Former local government areas of Queensland